is a Japanese international rugby union player who plays as a Loose Forward or Lock.   He currently plays for the Highlanders in Super Rugby and Toyota Verblitz in Japan's domestic Top League.

International
After only 9 Top League appearances for Toyota Verblitz, which included 8 starts, Himeno received his first call-up to Japan's senior squad ahead of the 2017 end-of-year rugby union internationals.

International tries 
As of 13 November 2022

References

External links
 

1994 births
Living people
People from Nagoya
Sportspeople from Nagoya
Japanese rugby union players
Japan international rugby union players
Rugby union flankers
Toyota Verblitz players
Rugby union locks
Sunwolves players
Rugby union number eights
Highlanders (rugby union) players